Sosialurin is a Faroese newspaper located in Tórshavn. It is written in the Faroese language. The newspaper, in partnership with Føroya Tele, a Faroese telecom, operates the website in.fo

History

The newspaper published its first copy on 27 May 1927, as the Føroya Social Demokrat, and originally it was associated with the Social Democratic Party. From 1945 to 1955 the newspaper circulated under the name Føroya Sosial-Demokratur. In 2006 the Social Democratic Party sold their part of the shares to a new company, Miðlahúsið, that was owned by the newspaper's management, employees and Føroya Tele.

Circulation
Sosialurin sold 7,300 copies daily as of 2000, and was the second largest newspaper in the Faroe Islands after Dimmalætting.

See also
 Media of the Faroe Islands

References

External links
sosialurin.fo 

Newspapers published in the Faroe Islands
Publications established in 1927